Laarne is a municipality located in the Belgian province of East Flanders. On 1 January 2018, Laarne had a total population of 	12,487. The total area is 32.07 km².
The current mayor of Laarne is Ignace De Baerdemaecker, from the VLD (Liberal) party.

History
The village lies to the east of Ghent, near a former course of the River the Scheldt and is notable for its castle. The castle dates from the twelfth and later centuries, notably, the seventeenth, and has been sympathetically restored and re-furnished.

The name arises from the Germanic hlaeri which signifies terrain seen as wooded and marshy. It is possible to speculate that the village originated in serving the castle, which in turn, guarded the river approach to Ghent from the sea. In the twelfth century, the river was less remote from the city than it is today. In 1040, Laarne was mentioned as Laren.

The lordship passed by inheritance through the families of Schoutheete, Van Vilsteren and others, finally to the counts of Ribaucourt.  The castle is now owned by the Vereniging van Historische Woonsteden van België (the Union of Historic Homesteads of Belgium).

Gallery

References

External links

Official website - Only available in Dutch

Municipalities of East Flanders
Populated places in East Flanders